Serhiy Skachenko (born 18 November 1972 in Pavlodar, Kazakhstan) is a former Ukrainian football player.

Career
He played for FC Seoul, then known as Anyang LG Cheetahs and Jeonnam Dragons of the South Korean K League.

Club statistics

National team statistics

International goals
Results list Ukraine's goal tally first.

References

External links
 

 

1972 births
Living people
Association football forwards
Soviet footballers
Ukrainian footballers
Ukrainian expatriate footballers
Ukraine international footballers
FC Temp Shepetivka players
FC Torpedo Moscow players
FC Torpedo-2 players
FC Metalist Kharkiv players
FC Dynamo Kyiv players
Jeonnam Dragons players
FC Metz players
Neuchâtel Xamax FCS players
Sanfrecce Hiroshima players
FC Karpaty Lviv players
FC Aarau players
Ukrainian Premier League players
Russian Premier League players
K League 1 players
Ligue 1 players
Ligue 2 players
J1 League players
Swiss Super League players
Expatriate footballers in Russia
Expatriate footballers in South Korea
Expatriate footballers in France
Expatriate footballers in Japan
Expatriate footballers in Switzerland
Expatriate footballers in Azerbaijan
People from Pavlodar
Turan-Tovuz IK players
Ukrainian expatriate sportspeople in Russia
Ukrainian expatriate sportspeople in South Korea
Ukrainian expatriate sportspeople in France
Ukrainian expatriate sportspeople in Japan
Ukrainian expatriate sportspeople in Switzerland
Ukrainian expatriate sportspeople in Azerbaijan